Maria Dadouch (Arabic :ماريا دعدوش) is a Syrian writer and novelist who was born in 1970. She has published 4 novels including "The Planet of Uncertainties" which won the Katara Prize novel in 2018. She has published many children books; and some of her books were translated into English such as "Omar and Oliver" and "The Fly Over the Pond".

Education and career 
Maria Dadouch is a Syrian writer and novelist. She was born in Damascus, Syria on 1970. She graduated from the University of California in Los Angeles (ULSC) and earned a degree in Creative Writing in 2015. In the beginning of her career, Dadouch helped in establishing Fulla magazine in 2005 where she wrote many articles and stories. She also wrote for the famous TV comedy series Maraya. Dadouch moved to the United States when the war in Syria started. In the past years, she published 4 novels and many children books which some were translated into English including "Omar and Oliver". Dadouch has also won several prestigious awards. In 2018, Dadouch's book "The Planet of Uncertainties" won Katara Prize for novel. In 2019, she won Shoman Prize for Science fiction novels for her book I Want Golden Eyes. In 2020, she won the Arab Publishers Forum Prize for her book "Him and I". Dadouch has also instructed in many writing courses which were sponsored by the Emirates Airlines Festival of Literature, Edraak, and 3asafeer. She was hosted by writing retreats like Hedgebrook/Seattle and Art OMI.

Works

Novels 

 "The Bad White" (original title: Al Zeft Al Abyad), 2019
 "The Plant of Uncertainties"  (original title: Kawkab Al La Maqoul), 2019
 "I Want Golden Eyes" (original title: Ureed Ayunan Thahabiya), 2019

"The Heart Which Is Totally Behind the Rib" (original title: Al Qalb Al Lathi Khalfa Al Deel' Tamaman), 2020

Children's book 

 "The Puzzle of the Wooden Door" (original title: Lugz Al Bab Al Khashabi), 2016
 "The Secret of the Magical Growth" (original title: Ser Al Numu Al Sehri), 2017
 "I Want Another Mum" (original title: Ureed Uman Othra), 2017
 SemSem Dot Com, 2018
 "Karma Karamila – Who Took My Apricot Pen?" (original title: Karma Karamila – Man Akhatha Qalami Al Meshmeshi?!), 2018
 "Me and Him" (original title: Ana wa Howa), 2018
 "Karma Karamila – The Girl of the Golden Lira" (original title: Karma Karamila – Fatat Al Leera Al Thahabia), 2018
 "Karma Karamila – A Big Problem" (original title: Karma Karmila – Mushkeela Kabeera), 2018
 "Do You Like the Scheme With the Narwhal" (original title: Hal Yarooq Laka Al Mukhatat Ma'a Al Muraqat?), 2018
 "Karma Karamila – I Don't Want to Go to the Pool" (original title: Karma Karamila – La Ureed Al Thahab Ela Al Masbah), 2019
 "One Evaporated ... Two You Are a Princess" (original title: Wahad Tabkhera ... Ethnan Anti Ameera), 2019
 "What Do Is Yasser Hiding?" (original title: Matha Yukhfi Yasser?", 2020
 "Omar and Oliver" (original title: Omar wa Oliver)
 "Gad and the Magic Grape Seed" (original title: Gad Wa Buthoor Al Enab Al Seheria)
 "The Diary of a Martian Boy" (original title: Muthakarat Fata Mareekhi)
 "Zakadam Can't Dance" (original title: Zakadam La Youmkenuhu Al Raqs)
 "Standing Hairdos Island" (original title: Jazeerat Al Tasreehat Al Waqeefa)
 "Mama Bot's Private Time" (original title: Waqat Mama Bot Al Khas)
 "The Shuttle of Eternal Youth" (original title: Mukawak Al Shabab Al Daeem)
 "The Adventure of a Frog who Was a Prince" (original title: Muqaamart Deefdaa Kana Ameeran)
 A Mug With A Lid: Syrians and the Sea, 2015
 A Fly Over a Pond

Awards 
Dadouch has won several awards:

 2018: won the Katara Prize for novel for her book "The Planet of Uncertainties".
 2019: won the Shoman Prize for Science Fiction novel for her book "I Want Golden Eyes"
 2020: won the Khalifa Educational Award novel for her novel "The Heart is Right Behind The Rib".
 2020: won the Arab Publishers Forum Prize for her book "I and Him".

See also 

 Taghreed Al Najjar
 Eman Al Yousuf
 Huda Hamed

References 

Syrian novelists
Syrian screenwriters
Living people
1970 births